Guy Bertin (born 25 November 1954) is a French former Grand Prix motorcycle road racer. His best year was in 1980 when he raced for the Motobécane factory racing team, winning three Grand Prix races and finishing in second place in the 125cc world championship behind Pier Paolo Bianchi. Bertin won six Grand Prix races during his career. Bertin is contesting the 2013 International Classic Grand Prix series on a Kawasaki KR350.

References 

1954 births
Living people
French motorcycle racers
125cc World Championship riders
250cc World Championship riders
350cc World Championship riders